The Škoda Kamiq is a subcompact crossover SUV (B-segment) produced by the Czech car manufacturer Škoda Auto since 2019. It is smallest of the other Škoda SUVs, namely the Karoq, Enyaq, and Kodiaq. Deliveries officially started in September 2019. It is based on the concept Vision X, which Škoda first introduced to the public in 2018. As with the Karoq and Kodiaq, the Kamiq name is based on a word from the Inuit language.

Overview 
The vehicle debuted at the February 2019 Geneva Auto Show, before its market release in late June 2019. While it takes styling cues from both the Karoq and Kodiaq to ensure a continuity between Skoda's SUVs, the Kamiq has several distinctive features, including a more upright grille and an optional narrow LED running lights. As with the new Scala, the boot displays the Skoda name in letters instead of the circular Skoda logo. 

The car is built on the Volkswagen Group MQB A0 platform used by the SEAT Arona and Volkswagen T-Cross, while offering more interior space than both. Škoda claims that the Kamiq has more rear legroom than in the Octavia and Karoq. The Kamiq is only offered with front-wheel drive since it is aimed primarily to families in urban areas and the MQB A0 platform that it uses does not support all-wheel drive drivetrain.

The global version of the Kamiq is unrelated to the Chinese market Kamiq, as the latter is larger and built on an older platform, but Škoda used the Kamiq name for both models they are the smallest SUVs it offers in each market.

Powertrain 
Five engine options are available for the Kamiq.

It is fitted with an SCR catalytic converter with AdBlue injection and a diesel particulate filter as standard.

Sales

References

External links

Official website

Cars introduced in 2019
Crossover sport utility vehicles
Front-wheel-drive vehicles
Mini sport utility vehicles
Kamiq
2020s cars